The 1953 Star World Championship was held in Napoli, Italy in 1953.

Results

References

Star World Championships
1953 in sailing
Sailing competitions in Italy
1953 in Italian sport